Nepali is an Indo-Aryan language native to the Himalayas region of South Asia. It is the official, and most widely spoken, language of Nepal, where it also serves as a lingua franca. Nepali has official status in the Indian state of Sikkim and in the Gorkhaland Territorial Administration of West Bengal. It is spoken by about a quarter of Bhutan's population. Nepali also has a significant number of speakers in the states of Arunachal Pradesh, Assam, Himachal Pradesh, Manipur, Meghalaya, Mizoram and Uttarakhand. In Myanmar it is spoken by the Burmese Gurkhas. The Nepali diaspora in the Middle East, Brunei, Australia and worldwide also use the language. Nepali is spoken by approximately 16 million native speakers and another 9 million as a second language.

Nepali is commonly classified within the Eastern Pahari group of the Northern zone of Indo-Aryan.
The language originated from the Sinja Valley, Karnali Province then the capital city of the Khasa Kingdom around the 10th and 14th centuries. It developed proximity to a number of Indo-Aryan languages, most significantly to other Pahari languages. Nepali was originally spoken by the Khas people, an Indo-Aryan ethno-linguistic group native to the Himalayan region of South Asia. The earliest inscription in the Nepali language is believed to be an inscription in Dullu, Dailekh District which was written around the reign of King Bhupal Damupal around the year 981. The institutionalisation of the Nepali language arose during the rule of the Kingdom of Gorkha (later became known as the Kingdom of Nepal) in the 16th century. Over the centuries, different dialects of the Nepali language with distinct influences from Sanskrit, Maithili, Hindi, and Bengali are believed to have emerged across different regions of the current-day Nepal and Uttarakhand, making Nepali the lingua franca.

Nepali is a highly fusional language with relatively free word order, although the dominant arrangement is subject–object–verb word order (SOV). There are three major levels or gradations of honorific: low, medium and high. Low honorific is used where no respect is due, medium honorific is used to signify equal status or neutrality, and high honorific signifies respect. Like all modern Indo-Aryan languages, Nepali grammar has syncretized heavily, losing much of the complex declensional system present in the older languages. Nepali developed significant literature within a short period of a hundred years in the 19th century. Around 1830, several Nepali poets wrote on themes from the Sanskrit epics Ramayana and the Bhagavata Purana, which was followed by Bhanubhakta Acharya translating the Ramayana in Nepali which received "great popularity for the colloquial flavour of its language, its religious sincerity, and its realistic natural descriptions".

Etymology 

The term Nepali derived from Nepal was officially adopted by the Government of Nepal in 1933, when Gorkha Bhasa Prakashini Samiti (Gorkha Language Publishing Committee), a government institution established in 1913 (B.S. 1970) for advancement of Gorkha Bhasa, renamed itself as Nepali Bhasa Prakashini Samiti (Nepali Language Publishing Committee) in 1933 (B.S. 1990), which is currently known as Sajha Prakashan. Conversely, the term Gorkhali in the former national anthem entitled "Shriman Gambhir" was changed to Nepali in 1951. However, the term Nepali was used before the official adoption notably by Jaya Prithvi Bahadur Singh, now considered one of the national heroes of Nepal, who advocated for the embracement of the term.

The initial name of Nepali language was Khas Kura, meaning language or speech of the Khas people, who are descended from the ancient Khasas of Mahabharata, as the language developed during the rule of the Khasa Kingdom in the western Nepal. Following the Unification of Nepal led by Shah dynasty's Prithvi Narayan Shah, Nepali language became known as Gorakhā Bhāṣā (language of the Gorkhas) as it was spoken by Gorkhas. The people living in the Pahad or the hilly region, where it does not generally contain snow, called the language Parvate Kurā, meaning the speech of the hills.

History

Origin and development 

Early forms of present-day Nepali developed from the Middle Indo-Aryan apabhraṃśa Vernaculars of present-day western Nepal in the 10th–14th centuries, during the times of the Khasa Kingdom. The language evolved from Sanskrit, Prakrit, and Apabhraṃśa. Following the decline of the Khasa Kingdom, it was divided into Baise Rajya (22 principalities) in Karnali-Bheri region and Chaubise rajya (24 principalities) in Gandaki region. The currently popular variant of Nepali is believed to have originated around 500 years ago with the mass migration of a branch of Khas people from the Karnali-Bheri-Seti eastward to settle in lower valleys of the Karnali and the Gandaki basin.

During the times of Sena dynasty, who ruled a vast area in Terai and central hills of Nepal, Nepali language became influenced by the Indian languages including Awadhi, Bhojpuri, Braj Bhasha and Maithili. Nepali speakers and Senas had a close connect, subsequently, the language became the lingua franca in the area. As a result, the grammar became simplified, vocabulary was expanded, and its phonology was softened, after it was syncretised, Nepali lost much of the complex declensional system present in the older languages. In the Kathmandu Valley (then known as Nepal Mandala), Nepali language inscriptions can be seen during the reigns of Lakshmi Narasimha Malla and Pratap Malla, which indicates the significant increment of Nepali speakers in Kathmandu Valley.

Middle Nepali 

The institutionalisation of the Nepali language is believed to have started with the Shah kings of Gorkha Kingdom, in the modern day Gorkha District of Nepal. Following the Unification of Nepal, the language moved to the court of the Kingdom of Nepal in the 18th century, where it became the state language. One of the earliest works in the Middile Nepali is written during the reign of Ram Shah, King of Gorkha, a book by unknown writer called Ram Shah ko Jivani (A Biography of Ram Shah). Prithvi Narayan Shah's Divyopadesh, written toward the end of his life, around 1774–75, contains old Nepali dialect of the era, is considered as the first work of essay of Nepali literature.  

During this time Nepali developed a standardized prose in the Lal mohar (royal charter)—documents related to the Nepalese Kingdom dealing with diplomatic writings, tax, and administrative records. The language of the Lal mohar is nearly modern with some minor differences in grammar and with a pre-modern orthography. Few changes including changing Kari (करि) to Gari (गरि) and merging Hunu (हुनु) with cha (छ) to create huncha (हुन्छ) were done. The most prominent work written during this time was Bhanubhakta Acharya's Bhanubhakta Ramayana, a translation of the epic Ramayana from Sanskrit to Nepali for the first time. Acharya's work led to which some describe as "cultural, emotional and linguistic unification" of Nepal, comparatively to Prithvi Narayan Shah who unified Nepal.

Modern Nepali 

The modern period of Nepali begins in the early 20th century. During this time the ruling Rana dynasty made various attempts to make Nepali the language of education, notably, by Dev Shumsher and Chandra Shumsher Jung Bahadur Rana, who established Gorkhapatra, and the Gorkha Bhasa Prakashini Samiti respectively. At this time, Nepali had limited literature compared to Hindi and Bengali languages, a movement notably in Banaras, and Darjeeling was started to create uniformed Nepali identity, which was later adopted in Nepal following the 1951 Nepalese revolution and during the Panchayat system. In 1957, Royal Nepal Academy was established with the objectives of developing and promoting Nepali literature, culture, art and science. During Panchayat, Nepal adopted a "One King, One Dress, One Language, One Nation" ideology, which promoted Nepali language as basis for Nepali nationalism, this time is considered to be a Golden Age for the language.

In West Bengal, Nepali language was recognised by West Bengal Government in 1961 as the official language for the Darjeeling district, and Kalimpong and Kurseong. The Nepali Language Movement took place in India around 1980s to include Nepali language in the Eighth Schedule to the Constitution of India. In 1977, Nepali was officially accepted by Sahitya Academy, an organisation dedicated to the promotion of Indian literature. After Sikkim was annex by India, the Sikkim Official Languages Act, 1977, made Nepali as one of the official languages of state. On 20 August 1992, the Lok Sabha passed a motion to add the Nepali language to the Eighth Schedule.

Official status

Nepal 
Part 1 of the Nepali Constitution deals with the official language of the Federal Democratic Republic of Nepal. Under Article 6, the official "language of the nation" will be "all languages spoken as the mother tongues in Nepal". In Article 7, the official language of Nepal have been written, which includes Nepali in Devanagari script: The Nepali language in the Devanagari script shall be the official language of Nepal.
 A Province may, by a provincial law, determine one or more than one languages of the nation spoken by a majority of people within the Province as its official language or languages, in addition to the Nepali language.
 Other matters relating to language shall be as decided by the Government of Nepal on recommendation of the Language Commission.

India 

On 31 August 1992, the Parliament of India passed a bill to amend the Eighth Schedule to the Constitution of India to give Konkani, Manipuri, and Nepali as a languages with official status in India. Nepali has official status in the Indian state of Sikkim and in the Gorkhaland Territorial Administration of West Bengal. Nepali also has a significant number of speakers in the states of Arunachal Pradesh, Assam, Himachal Pradesh, Manipur, Meghalaya, Mizoram and Uttarakhand.

Bhutan 
Despite Nepali language being spoken by about a quarter of population in Bhutan, it has no official status in Bhutan. The native speakers of Nepali are known as Lhotshampa ("southerners"). Many of Nepali-language speaking Bhutanese people were displaced by various laws enacted by the Bhutanese government.

Geographic distribution 

According to the 2011 national census, 44.6% of the population of Nepal speaks Nepali as its first language. and 32.8% speak Nepali as a second language. Ethnologue reports 12,300,000 speakers within Nepal (from the 2011 census).

Nepali is traditionally spoken in the hilly regions of Nepal. The language is prominently used by the government of Nepal and is the everyday language of the local population. The exclusive use of Nepali in the court system and by the government of Nepal, however, is being challenged. Gaining recognition for other languages of Nepal was one of the goals of the decades-long Maoist insurgency.

In Bhutan, native Nepali speakers, known as Lhotshampa, are estimated at 35% of the population. This number includes displaced Bhutanese refugees, with unofficial estimates of the ethnic Bhutanese refugee population as high as 30 to 40%, constituting a majority in the south (about 242,000 people).

According to the 2011 Census of India, there were a total of 2,926,168 Nepali language speakers in India.

Nepali is the third-most spoken language in the Australian territory of Tasmania, where it is spoken by 1.3% of its population, and fifth-most spoken language in the Northern Territory, Australia, spoken by 1.3% of its population.

Phonology

Vowels and consonants are outlined in the tables below.

Vowels

Nepali distinguishes six oral vowels and five nasal vowels. /o/ does not have a phonemic nasal counterpart, although it is often in free variation with [õ].

Nepali has ten diphthongs: /ui̯/, /iu̯/, /ei̯/, /eu̯/, /oi̯/, /ou̯/, /ʌi̯/, /ʌu̯/, /ai̯/, and /au̯/.

Consonants

[j] and [w] are nonsyllabic allophones of [i] and [u], respectively. Every consonant except [j], [w], and /ɦ/ has a geminate counterpart between vowels. /ɳ/ and /ʃ/ also exist in some loanwords such as /baɳ/  "arrow" and /nareʃ/  "king", but these sounds are sometimes replaced with native Nepali phonemes.

Final schwas may or may not be preserved in speech. The following rules can be followed to figure out whether or not Nepali words retain the final schwa:

 Schwa is retained if the final syllable is a conjunct consonant.
 For any verb form the final schwa is always retained unless the schwa-cancelling halanta is present.  ('it happens'),  ('in happening so; therefore'),  ('he apparently went'), but  ('they are'),  ('she went'). Meanings may change with the wrong orthography:  ('she didn't go') vs  ('she went').
 Adverbs, onomatopoeia and postpositions usually maintain the schwa and if they don't, halanta is acquired:  ( 'now'),  ('towards'),  ('today')  ( 'drizzle') vs  ('more').
 Few exceptional nouns retain the schwa such as:  ('suffering'),  ('pleasure').

Note: Schwas are often retained in music and poetry to add extra syllables when needed.

Grammar

Nepali is a highly fusional language with relatively free word order, although the dominant arrangement is SOV (subject–object–verb). There are three major levels or gradations of honorifics: low, medium and high. Low honorific is used where no respect is due, medium honorific is used to signify equal status or neutrality, and high honorific signifies respect. There is also a separate highest level honorific, which was used to refer to members of the royal family, and by the royals among themselves. Like all modern Indo-Aryan languages, Nepali grammar has syncretized heavily, losing much of the complex declensional system present in the older languages. Instead, it relies heavily on periphrasis, a marginal verbal feature of older Indo-Aryan languages.

Writing system 

Nepali is written in Devanagari script.

In the section below Nepali is represented in Latin transliteration using the IAST scheme and IPA. The chief features are: subscript dots for retroflex consonants; macrons for etymologically, contrastively long vowels; h denoting aspirated plosives. Tildes denote nasalised vowels.

Consonants

Vowels

Literature 

Nepali developed significant literature within a short period of a hundred years in the 19th century. This literary explosion was fuelled by Adhyatma Ramayana; Sundarananda Bara (1833); Birsikka, an anonymous collection of folk tales; and a version of the ancient Indian epic Ramayana by Bhanubhakta Acharya (d. 1868). The contribution of trio-laureates Lekhnath Paudyal, Laxmi Prasad Devkota, and Balkrishna Sama took Nepali to the level of other world languages. The contribution of expatriate writers outside Nepal, especially in Darjeeling and Varanasi in India, is also notable.

Dialects
Dialects of Nepali include Acchami, Baitadeli, Bajhangi, Bajurali, Bheri, Dadeldhuri, Dailekhi, Darchulali, Darchuli, Gandakeli, Humli, Purbeli, and Soradi. These dialects can be distinct from Standard Nepali. Mutual intelligibility between Baitadeli, Bajhangi, Bajurali (Bajura), Humli, and Acchami is low. The dialect of Nepali language spoken in Karnali Province is not mutually intelligible with Standard Nepali. The language is known with its old name as Khas Bhasa in Karnali.

Sample text
The following is a sample text in Nepali, of Article 1 of the Universal Declaration of Human Rights, with a transliteration (IAST) and transcription (IPA).

 Nepali in Devanagari Script
 धारा १. सबै व्यक्तिहरू जन्मजात स्वतन्त्र हुन् ती सबैको समान अधिकार र महत्व छ। निजहरूमा विचार शक्ति र सद्विचार भएकोले निजहरूले आपसमा भातृत्वको भावनाबाट व्यवहार गर्नु पर्छ। 

 Transliteration (ISO)
 Dhārā 1. Sabai vyaktiharū janmajāt svatantra hun tī sabaiko samān adhikār ra mahatva cha. Nijharūmā vicār śakti ra sadvicār bhaekole nijharūle āpasmā bhatṛtvako bhāvanabāṭa vyavahār garnu parcha.

 Transcription (IPA)

 [dʱaɾa ek sʌbʌi̯ bektiɦʌɾu d͡zʌnmʌd͡zat sotʌntɾʌ ɦun ti sʌbʌi̯ko sʌman ʌd(ʱ)ikaɾ rʌ mʌːtːo t͡sʰʌ nid͡zɦʌɾuma bit͡saɾ sʌkti ɾʌ sʌdbit͡sar bʱʌekole nid͡zɦʌɾule apʌsma bʱatɾitːoko bʱawʌnabaʈʌ bebaːr ɡʌɾnu pʌɾt͡sʰʌ]

 Gloss (word-to-word)

 Article 1. All human-beings from-birth independent are their all equal right and importance is. In themselves, intellect and conscience {endowed therefore} they {one another} brotherhood's spirit {treatment with} do must.

 Translation (grammatical)

 Article 1. All human beings are born free and equal in dignity and rights. They are endowed with reason and conscience and should act towards one another in a spirit of brotherhood.

See also 
 Nepal Sambat
 Nepali language movement

References

Footnotes

Bibliography

Further reading

 , . . (2000), ।
 Schmidt, R. L. (1993) A Practical Dictionary of Modern Nepali. 
 Turner, R. L. (1931) A Comparative and Etymological Dictionary of the Nepali Language. 
 Clements, G.N. & Khatiwada, R. (2007). "Phonetic realization of contrastively aspirated affricates in Nepali." In Proceedings of ICPhS XVI (Saarbrücken, 6–10 August 2007), 629- 632.  
 Hutt, M. & Subedi, A. (2003) Teach Yourself Nepali.
 
 Manders, C. J. (2007)  A Foundation in Nepali Grammar.
 Dr. Dashrath Kharel, "Nepali linguistics spoken in Darjeeling-Sikkim"

External links

 List of Nepali words at Wiktionary, the free dictionary
 Omniglot – Nepali Language
 Barala – Easy Nepali Typing
  | Nepali Brihat Shabdakosh (Comprehensive Nepali Dictionary) | "Nepal Academy"
  | Nepali Brihat Shabdakosh – Nepali Dictionary "Nepali Brihat Shabdakosh Latest Edition"

 
Fusional languages
Indo-Aryan languages
Languages attested from the 10th century
Languages of Arunachal Pradesh
Languages of Assam
Languages of Bagmati Province
Languages of Bhutan
Languages of Gandaki Province
Languages of Himachal Pradesh
Languages of Karnali Province
Languages of Koshi Province
Languages of Lumbini Province
Languages of Madhesh Province
Languages of Nepal
Languages of Sikkim
Languages of Sudurpashchim Province
Languages of Uttarakhand
Languages of West Bengal
Languages officially written in Indic scripts
Languages written in Devanagari
Languages written in Indic scripts
Lingua francas
National symbols of Nepal
Northern Indo-Aryan languages
Official languages of India
Official languages of Nepal
Sahitya Akademi recognised languages
Standard languages
Subject–object–verb languages